Voyvodovo is a village in the municipality of Haskovo, in Haskovo Province, in southern Bulgaria.

Gallery

References 

Villages in Haskovo Province